Mary Belle Allen  (November 11, 1922, Morristown, New Jersey  –1973, Fairbanks, Alaska) was an American botanist, chemist, mycologist, algologist, and plant pathologist, and a  pioneer of biochemical microbiology.  With Daniel I. Arnon and F. Robert Whatley, she did breakthrough research discovering and demonstrating the role of chloroplasts in photosynthesis. In 1962 she received the  Darbaker Prize from the Botanical Society of America for her work on microbial algae. In 1967 she was nominated jointly (but unsuccessfully) with Arnon and Whatley for a Nobel Prize.

The abbreviation M.B.Allen is used to indicate Mary Belle Allen as the author of the description and scientific classification of genera and species. (Consult IPNI).

Career
Mary Belle Allen was a daughter of Frederick Madison Allen and Belle W. Allen.  She had a sister, Dorothy Llewellyn Allen (later Flynn).

Bachelor's degree
Allen earned her Bachelor's Degree with Honors in 1941 from the College of Chemistry at the University of California in Berkeley, California. She was 19.

Ph.D. degree
Allen was accepted as a Ph.D. student of the University of California by Sam Ruben in Berkeley.  
Allen is listed as an assistant at the Lawrence Radiation Laboratory at the University of California in Berkeley for 1941-42 and as a chemist for the Manhattan District for 1942-44. While working with Ruben, she used radioactive tracers to study photosynthesis and chlorophyll.

Following Sam Ruben's death in 1943, Allen transferred to Columbia University. 
Allen received a DuPont fellowship for 1945-1946 and completed her Ph.D. in physical chemistry at Columbia University in 1946, with a thesis on Phosphorus in Starch.

Postdoctoral work
For 1946-1947, Allen received a National Research Council fellowship in chemistry at Washington University in St. Louis. She also spent a year at the Marine Biological Laboratory at the University of Chicago as a visiting fellow with James Franck and Hans Gaffron, possibly around 1951.

In 1947, she became a research associate at Mt. Sinai Hospital, New York. The first part of this appointment occurred at  Hopkins Marine Station of Stanford University, California. where "Dr. Mary Belle Allen" was listed as a "visiting Investigator" from Mt. Sinai Hospital, New York. 
Initial funding for the project came from biochemist Harry Sobotka at Mt. Sinai Hospital, who had received a grant from the U.S. Public Health Service. She was able to continue the work through Stanford with funding from the Office of Naval Research. 

At Hopkins Marine Station Allen worked with C. B. van Niel  on the physiology and biochemistry of thermophiles, bacteria that can survive at high temperatures. 
In 1952, she reported that she had isolated an "unidentified unicellular alga" from the acid waters of "Lemonade Spring", The Geysers, Sonoma County, California.  Later work suggested that it was similar to forms of Cyanidium caldarium independently discovered by Hiroyuki Hirose (1950), Felix Eugen Fritsch (1945), and Kenichiro Negoro (1935).
Allen was also able to study blue-green algae, publishing a "fundamental paper" on their cultivation in 1952.

University of California, Berkeley
In the mid 1950s, Allen worked at the  University of California, Berkeley with Daniel I. Arnon and F. Robert Whatley in breakthrough research on the role of chloroplasts in photosynthesis processes.  Arnon et al. were the first to publish a demonstration of the synthesis of ATP in light by chloroplasts in 1954, followed by a more detailed paper by Allen et al. in 1955.

A visiting student describes the type of procedure that was followed:

Allen investigated nitrogen fixing of blue green algae and other microorganisms in both freshwater and oceans. She studied the growth of algae alongside rice as a way of enhancing the fertility of rice.
As of 1956, she reported on the photosynthetic products of Chlamydomonas.  In January 1957 she was listed by  the Phycological Society of America as studying plankton as an assistant research biochemist and lecturer in physiology in the Department of Soils and Plant Nutrition, University of California, Berkeley.

In 1967 Allen was nominated jointly for a Nobel Prize with D.I.Arnon and Frederick Whatley. The nomination was put forward by J.H.Northrop but was not successful.

Kaiser Foundation Research Institute 
In 1958, the Kaiser Foundation Research Institute (Kaiser Permanente) formally established a Laboratory of Comparative Physiology and Morphology in Richmond, California, for fundamental research in comparative biology. Ellsworth C. Dougherty was named the director, and Mary Belle Allen was named the associate director. 
Using spectrophotometry and other techniques, she continued to examine chlorophyll absorption and to study algal phylogenesis.

In 1960 she edited the published proceedings of the First Annual Symposium on Comparative Biology of the Kaiser Permanente Research Institute in Richmond. Allen received funding from a number of sources including the National Institute of Health  in Bethesda, Maryland.
In 1962 she received the  Darbaker Prize from the Botanical Society of America "for outstanding contributions to phycology".

University of Alaska
In 1966 Allen was recruited as professor of microbiology at the University of Alaska in Fairbanks, Alaska.  There she worked with the  Institute of Marine Science 
She studied high-latitude phytoplankton  and chrysophyceae.
To better understand populations of aquatic microorganisms in lakes in interior Alaska, she studied bacteria in soil, which can wash into lakes. This research led to an unexpected result.  She found that in many soil samples  there were very few bacterial cells; some were comparable to sterilized soil.

Memberships
 American Society of Limnology and Oceanography
 Botanical Society of America

Publications

External links 
 "Celebrating forty years of the conference on 'Photosynthetic Mechanisms of Green Plants' at Airlie House, Virginia." A group photograph including Mary Belle Allen (#36), 1963.

References 

1922 births
1973 deaths
UC Berkeley College of Chemistry alumni
Columbia Graduate School of Arts and Sciences alumni
American women biochemists
American women chemists
20th-century American women scientists
20th-century American chemists